The 2017–18 Mizoram Premier League is the sixth season of the Mizoram Premier League, the top-division football league in the Indian state of Mizoram. The league began on 31 August 2017 with eight teams competing.

Teams
 Aizawl
 Bethlehem Vengthlang FC
 Chanmari
 Chanmari West FC
 Chhinga Veng
 Dinthar FC
 Mizoram Police 
 Ramhlun North FC

Standings

Finals

Bracket

Semi-finals

Leg 1

Leg 2

Final

Awards
After the league final, the following awards and respective winners were announced:

Goalscorers

3 Goals
  Malsawmfela (Chhinga Veng)

2 Goals 
  Fanai Lalrinpuia (Mizoram Police)

1 Goal
  Lalrammawia (Bethlehem Vengthlang) 
  Vanlalthanga (Bethlehem Vengthlang) 
  H Lallianzama (Chanmari West)
  Lalliansanga (Ramhlun North) 
  Jonathan Lalrawngbawla (Aizawl) 
  Laldampuia (Chhinga Veng) 
  Malsawmtluanga (Chhinga Veng)
  Jacob Vanlalhlimpuia (Chanmari)
  Rosangliama (Ramhlun North)
  PC Lalthanthuanma (Dinthar)
  PC Laldinpuia (Bethlehem Vengthlang)
  Vanlallawma (Chhinga Veng) 
  R Malsawmtluanga (Chhinga Veng) 
  Lalmuanzuala (Chanmari)
  David Lalrinmuana (Aizawl)

References

External links
 Mizoram Premier League on facebook

Mizoram Premier League
2017–18 in Indian football leagues